Waterview is a suburb of Auckland, New Zealand, located along the western side of Auckland's isthmus. Its boundaries are Oakley Creek in the east, Heron Park in the south, the Waitematā Harbour (and Motu Manawa (Pollen Island) Marine Reserve) in the west, and the Northwestern Motorway and the Oakley Creek inlet in the north.

Waterview is primarily a residential area, with its residents commuting to work. There are few shops: a dairy, laundromat, bakery, and a community-owned cafe. Community facilities are available at Point Chevalier or Avondale, 20–30 minutes walk away.

Demographics

Waterview had a population of 3,375 at the 2018 New Zealand census, an increase of 72 people (2.2%) since the 2013 census, and an increase of 30 people (0.9%) since the 2006 census. There were 1,149 households, comprising 1,623 males and 1,749 females, giving a sex ratio of 0.93 males per female. The median age was 32.9 years (compared with 37.4 years nationally), with 603 people (17.9%) aged under 15 years, 882 (26.1%) aged 15 to 29, 1,587 (47.0%) aged 30 to 64, and 300 (8.9%) aged 65 or older.

Ethnicities were 54.6% European/Pākehā, 10.7% Māori, 20.5% Pacific peoples, 21.6% Asian, and 6.4% other ethnicities. People may identify with more than one ethnicity.

The percentage of people born overseas was 37.2, compared with 27.1% nationally.

Although some people chose not to answer the census's question about religious affiliation, 48.2% had no religion, 35.1% were Christian, 0.5% had Māori religious beliefs, 3.0% were Hindu, 3.5% were Muslim, 2.0% were Buddhist and 2.7% had other religions.

Of those at least 15 years old, 984 (35.5%) people had a bachelor's or higher degree, and 339 (12.2%) people had no formal qualifications. The median income was $35,300, compared with $31,800 nationally. 615 people (22.2%) earned over $70,000 compared to 17.2% nationally. The employment status of those at least 15 was that 1,503 (54.2%) people were employed full-time, 402 (14.5%) were part-time, and 135 (4.9%) were unemployed.

History 

The Waterview (Its maori name, Waitango) area, especially along the coast and inlet areas, has a relatively high incidence of archeologically significant areas, from old settlement remnants (both Maori and early European settler), to a comparatively well-retained site of an old mill/tannery and quarry (Star Mill/Garret Bros Tannery) which is scheduled as a Category I Historic Place, and which once used the stream waters to drive a waterwheel.

The population of Waterview has been stable since the 2006 census.

Transport

A major issue that faced Waterview was the construction of SH20 from Hillsborough through to the Northwestern Motorway. The route through Waterview was highly contentious until (and to a degree after) a fast-tracked Board of Inquiry process consented a route in mid-2011, which placed a new motorway tunnel portal and motorway interchange at the north end of the suburb, causing the removal of numerous homes in the area.

Public transport facilities from Waterview allow access to a range of destinations in Auckland, and a shared walking and cycling path is proposed to link Waterview with Mt Albert and several other suburbs along the State Highway 16 cycle route.

Education
It had to be demolished and a new school built as part of the Waterview Connection.

There is no secondary school in the suburb; nearby state secondary schools include Avondale College, Western Springs College and Mount Albert Grammar School.

References

External links
Photographs of Waterview held in Auckland Libraries' heritage collections.

Suburbs of Auckland
Populated places around the Waitematā Harbour